Franz Goeschke (German spelling, Göschke); (1844 – 1912) was a German horticulturist who was director of horticulture and head of the Royal Prussian Pomological Institute in Proskau. His father, Gottlieb Göschke (1818-1898), was also a noted horticulturalist.
 
Franz Göschke was a leading authority of strawberry cultivation. He is credited with creating around thirty new varieties of strawberry, including the once popular Erdbeere Königin Luise (Queen Luise strawberry), a variety he first introduced in 1905.

Selected publications 
 Die rationelle Spargelzucht (Rational asparagus cultivation), 1882.
 Die Haselnuss, ihre Arten und ihre Kultur (Hazelnuts, types and cultivars), 1885.
 Das Buch der Erdbeeren (The book of strawberries), 2nd edition 1888.
 Der Hausgarten auf dem Lande (The garden in the countryside), 1899.
 Einfassungspflanzen (Edging plants), 1900.
 Einträgliche Spargelzucht (Lucrative asparagus cultivation), 1904.
 The hazel, 1922; English translation of works by Göschke and Karl Koch.

References 
 Strawberry Breeding and Industry on the European Continent

German agriculturalists
1844 births
1912 deaths
German gardeners